Malpass is a surname. Notable people with the surname include:

David Malpass (born 1956), American economist and politician
Eric Malpass (1910–1996), English novelist
Michael Malpass (1946–1991), sculptor and artist best known for his spheres
Monica Malpass (born 1961), American journalist and television anchor
Sam Malpass (1918–1983), professional footballer
Steve Malpass (born 1971), former designer and voice actor

See also
MILPAS
Malbas
Malpais (disambiguation)
Malpas (disambiguation)
Malpaso (disambiguation)
Malpasse
Malpaís (disambiguation)